František Kadaňka (born 8 October 1944 in Dolní Kounice) is a former Czechoslovak slalom canoeist who competed in the 1960s and 1970s. He won five medals at the ICF Canoe Slalom World Championships with three silvers (C-1 team: 1969; C-2 team: 1973, 1975) and two bronzes (C-2: 1975, C-2 team: 1971).

Kadaňka also finished tenth in the C-2 event at the 1972 Summer Olympics in Munich.

References

1944 births
Canoeists at the 1972 Summer Olympics
Czechoslovak male canoeists
Living people
Olympic canoeists of Czechoslovakia
Medalists at the ICF Canoe Slalom World Championships
People from Dolní Kounice
Sportspeople from the South Moravian Region